Lyperanthus suaveolens, commonly called brown beaks, is a species of orchid that is endemic to the eastern states of Australia.

Description
The flowers are sometimes fragrant in warm weather.

Taxonomy and naming
The species was first described by Robert Brown in 1810 in Prodromus Florae Novae Hollandiae et Insulae Van Diemen. The specific epithet (suaveolens) is derived from the Latin suaveolens meaning "sweet-smelling".

Distribution and habitat
The species occurs in woodland areas of Queensland, New South Wales, Victoria and Tasmania.

Use in horticulture
As with other Australian terrestrial orchids, this species is not well known in cultivation but success has been achieved by growing it in a shadehouse of 50-70% shadecloth.

References

suaveolens
Flora of Queensland
Flora of New South Wales
Flora of Victoria (Australia)
Flora of Tasmania
Plants described in 1810
Taxa named by Robert Brown (botanist, born 1773)